Al Mansour Al-Malajm is a sub-district located in the Al Malagim District, Al Bayda Governorate, Yemen. Al Mansour Al-Malajm had a population of 9562 according to the 2004 census.

References 

Sub-districts in Al Malagim District